"I Need Some Fine Wine and You, You Need to Be Nicer" is the first single from Swedish rock band the Cardigans' sixth album, Super Extra Gravity (2005). The single was released in September 2005 and includes the B-side "For the Boys", which was previously released as the bonus track on the American release of their fifth album, Long Gone Before Daylight (2003), as well as "Explode" and "My Favourite Game", which were recorded live at the Kyiv Sporthall on December 2003.

The single was successful in Sweden, where it debuted and peaked at number three on 6 October 2005, but it was not commercially successful elsewhere, failing to reach the top 50 in Germany and the United Kingdom. The song's music video was directed by Martin Renck and Jakob Ström.

Track listings
 Scandinavian CD single
 "I Need Some Fine Wine and You, You Need to Be Nicer" – 3:33
 "For the Boys" – 3:37

 European CD single
 "I Need Some Fine Wine and You, You Need to Be Nicer" – 3:33
 "Explode" (live in Kyiv) – 3:37
 "My Favourite Game" (live in Kyiv) – 5:48

 European 7-inch single
A. "I Need Some Fine Wine and You, You Need to Be Nicer" – 3:33
B. "Explode" (live in Kyiv) – 4:34

Charts

Weekly charts

Year-end charts

Release history

References

2005 singles
2005 songs
The Cardigans songs
Stockholm Records singles
Songs written by Nina Persson
Songs written by Peter Svensson